Alfred Ogden (December 31, 1843 – July 29, 1919) was a political figure in Nova Scotia, Canada. He represented Guysborough in the House of Commons of Canada from 1878 to 1882 as a Liberal-Conservative member.

He was born in Port Elgin, New Brunswick, the son of John F. Ogden, of United Empire Loyalist descent, and was educated there. Ogden settled in Cape Canso, Nova Scotia. In 1866, he married Annie Cook. Ogden was unsuccessful in bids for reelection to the House of Commons in 1882 and 1891.

Electoral record

References

1843 births
1919 deaths
Conservative Party of Canada (1867–1942) MPs
Members of the House of Commons of Canada from Nova Scotia